Kulczyński (feminine: Kulczyńska, plural: Kulczyńscy) is a Polish surname. Notable people with the surname include:

 Stanisław Kulczyński (1895-1975), Polish botanist and politician
 Władysław Kulczyński (1854-1919), Polish zoologist

Polish-language surnames